Casual vacancies in the Dewan Undangan Negeri (state legislative assembly) are filled by by-elections, which may occur when a member of the Dewan Undangan Negeri dies, resigns or for some other reason. Members of the Dewan Undangan Negeri normally tender the resignation to the Speaker. The Speaker has a discretion as to when to call a by-election and may not call one at all, for example, if a general election is imminent.

Brackets around a date indicate that the candidate was unopposed when nominations closed.  These candidates were declared "elected unopposed" with effect from the date of the closing of nominations, and there was no need to hold a by-election.

2022-present

2018–22

2013–18

2008–13

2004–08

1999–2004

1995–99

1990–95

1986–90

1982–86

1978–82

1974–78

1969–74

1964–69

1959–64

1955–59

References

 
State legislatures of Malaysia